The following is a list of all 172 episodes of the NBC television series Wings.

Series overview

Episodes

Season 1 (1990)

Season 2 (1990–91)

Season 3 (1991–92)

Season 4 (1992–93)

Season 5 (1993–94)

Season 6 (1994–95)

Season 7 (1995–96)

Season 8 (1996–97)

Home releases
All eight seasons of this series have been released on DVD.

Notes

References

External links
 Episode airdates and summaries from TV.com

Wings